The Federation of the Lefts was a French electoral coalition during the French Third Republic founded in January 1914 by members of the Democratic Republican Alliance such Aristide Briand, Alexandre Millerand and Louis Barthou to provide a centrist alternative to the left's coalition, led by the Radical-Socialist Joseph Caillaux. However, the federation failed to attract the most moderate Radical voters and the left won the 1914 election which saw the centre fall back. The Federation was a failure.

However, a parliamentary group under the name Republican, Radical and Radical-Socialist Union (Union républicaine radicale et radicale-socialiste) was formed in the new legislature and held a relatively important position in the legislature.

See also 
Democratic Republican Alliance
Sinistrisme

Defunct political party alliances in France
Political parties of the French Third Republic
Parliamentary groups in France
Political parties established in 1914
1914 establishments in France
Political parties with year of disestablishment missing
Opportunist Republicans